The seventh electoral unit of the Federation of Bosnia and Herzegovina is a parliamentary constituency used to elect members to the House of Representatives of the Federation of Bosnia and Herzegovina since 2000.  It consists of Bosnian-Podrinje Canton Goražde and the southern part of Sarajevo Canton, including the municipalities of Novi Grad, Hadžići, Trnovo and Ilidža.

Demographics

Representatives

References

Constituencies of Bosnia and Herzegovina